Ballatha is an Indomalayan genus of moths in the family Nolidae, in which it is either placed incertae sedis, or as part of the subfamily Chloephorinae. The genus was formerly considered part of the Noctuidae, subfamily Chloephorinae.

Ballatha species are known to occur in northern India and Myanmar (B. laeta), Hainan (B. aurata) and on Borneo (B. willotti).

Species
Listed alphabetically:

Ballatha aurata (Warren, 1916)
Ballatha laeta Walker, [1866]
Ballatha willotti Holloway, 2003

Notes and references

Nolidae
Moth genera